The 2007 Colorado State Rams football team  represented Colorado State University in the college football 2007 NCAA Division I FBS football season. They played their home games at Sonny Lubick Field at Hughes Stadium in Fort Collins, CO  and were led by head coach Sonny Lubick in his final season at CSU. The Rams finished the season 3–9 (2–6 MWC) for eighth place in the Mountain West Conference.

Schedule

References

Colorado State
Colorado State Rams football seasons
Colorado State Rams football